Yatesville Methodist Church is a historic Methodist church in Potter, Yates County, New York. It is a Greek Revival style structure built about 1837.

It was listed on the National Register of Historic Places in 1994.

References

Churches on the National Register of Historic Places in New York (state)
Methodist churches in New York (state)
Greek Revival church buildings in New York (state)
Churches in Yates County, New York
Churches completed in 1837
National Register of Historic Places in Yates County, New York